Hans Yngve Antonsson (8 November 1934 – 2 September 2021) was a Swedish freestyle wrestler who won a bronze medal at the 1960 Olympics. His uncle Bertil Antonsson was also an Olympic wrestler.

References

External links
 

1934 births
2021 deaths
People from Trollhättan
Olympic wrestlers of Sweden
Wrestlers at the 1960 Summer Olympics
Swedish male sport wrestlers
Olympic bronze medalists for Sweden
Olympic medalists in wrestling
Medalists at the 1960 Summer Olympics
Sportspeople from Västra Götaland County
20th-century Swedish people